The Waiaua River is the name of two rivers in New Zealand:

 Waiaua River (Bay of Plenty)
 Waiaua River (Taranaki)

See also
 Waiau River (disambiguation)